The Central District of Salmas County is in West Azerbaijan province, Iran. At the National Census in 2006, its population was 150,256 in 34,974 households. The following census in 2011 counted 165,639 people in 43,485 households. At the latest census in 2016, the district had 168,630 inhabitants in 47,608 households.

References 

Salmas County

Districts of West Azerbaijan Province

Populated places in West Azerbaijan Province

Populated places in Salmas County